The following are the members of the Dewan Undangan Negeri or state assemblies, elected in the 2013 state election and by-elections. Also included is the list of the Sarawak state assembly members who were elected in 2016.

The opposition coalition Pakatan Rakyat that contested the general elections in 2013 was dissolved after series of disagreements between two main parties, Democratic Action Party (DAP) and Pan-Malaysian Islamic Party (PAS). A new opposition coalition Pakatan Harapan was formed by the Democratic Action Party, People's Justice Party (PKR) and newly formed party  National Trust Party (PAN), consisting of ex-PAS members. Several ex-UMNO members have also formed their own party Malaysian United Indigenous Party (BERSATU) and have signed an electoral pact with Pakatan Harapan to contest the future general election and ensure straight fights against Barisan Nasional. On 20 March 2017 BERSATU officially became a member of Pakatan Harapan.

Composition

<onlyinclude>

Perlis

Kedah

Elected members

Seating arrangement

Kelantan

Terengganu

Penang

Perak

Pahang

Selangor

Negeri Sembilan

Malacca

Johor

Sabah

Sarawak

2016–2021

Following the state election that was held on 7 May 2016, Barisan Nasional was able to form the next state government with a majority of 72 seats out of 82. There were several candidates from breakaway parties such as TERAS and UPP that had their members contest seats under the Barisan banner as direct election candidates under a deal by Adenan Satem after their parties were prevented from joining Barisan after opposition from parties such as PDP and SUPP. On 12 June 2018, all Sarawak-based BN parties including Parti Pesaka Bumiputera Bersatu (PBB), Parti Rakyat Sarawak (PRS), Progressive Democratic Party (PDP) and Sarawak United People's Party (SUPP) officially left Barisan Nasional forming a new coalition Sarawak Parties Alliance due to Barisan Nasional's defeat in general elections on 9 May 2018.

Notes

References

2013 elections in Malaysia